The 1981 Copa Fraternidad was the 11th edition of the Central American football club championship organized by UNCAF, the regional governing body of Central America.

Real España won their first title by winning the final round, as Olimpia and Marathón quit the tournament.

Teams
Only El Salvador, Guatemala and Honduras sent representatives.

First round

|}

Second round

|}

Final Round

See also
 1981 CONCACAF Champions' Cup

References

1981
Copa Fraternidad